General Hurley may refer to:

David Hurley (born 1953), Australian Army general 
Patrick J. Hurley (1883–1963), U.S. Army major general
Paul K. Hurley (born 1961), U.S. Army major general